Dana Gould ((born August 24, 1964) is an American stand-up comedian, actor, writer and voice artist who has been featured on HBO, Showtime, and Comedy Central. He voiced Hi Larious in the TV series Father of the Pride (2004–2005) and the titular character in the Gex franchise.

Early life
Gould was born in Hopedale, Massachusetts on August 24, 1964, the fifth of six children. He was raised Roman Catholic, and served as an altar boy in the Roman Catholic Diocese of Worcester.

Career

Gould began performing comedy onstage at age 17. After high school, he studied communications and theatre at Framingham State College, but after a year moved to San Francisco to pursue a career in comedy. It was there he, along with fellow comedian Alex Reid, founded the San Francisco Comedy Condo in 1986.

Gould wrote and performed on The Ben Stiller Show; one such sketch features Gould as Otto, Cupid's twisted brother, whose arrows convince a young man to fall madly in love with an elderly woman. Another series of sketches features a heavily disguised Gould as Wilford Brimley advertising "Grady's Oats" (a parody of Brimley's Quaker Oats advertisements). In one, he speaks of his Uncle Ray's hobby of dressing in a pink taffeta gown and filling his panties with oatmeal; in another, he brandishes a revolver through the window at children. He also appeared in an episode of MADtv as Newt Gingrich and on one episode of Seinfeld ("The Junk Mail") as "Fragile" Frankie Merman, Jerry's childhood friend. He co-created and was executive producer on Super Adventure Team. In addition, Gould's stand up material was featured in Comedy Central's animated series Shorties Watchin' Shorties.

In 1998, Gould appeared in the episode "Supermarket Story" of The King of Queens.

Gould wrote for The Simpsons for seven years (2001–2007), and served as co-executive producer on seasons 14 through 18 (2002–2007). During his time with the show, Gould provided voice work on three episodes, including a 2005 episode on which he provided the voice of Don Knotts as Barney Fifean impression that originated in his stand-up routine. Though Gould left the show to focus on his own screenwriting, he has returned three times to voice characters.

Gould had a featured cameo in Girls Will Be Girls, in which he played a hit-and-run victim who admits to his alcohol problem after having a desperate one-night stand with aging C-list actress Evie Harris, the other driver in the car accident. He was also featured in  The Aristocrats, where, among other commentary, he presents an Amish version of the eponymous joke. His short films, Last Man On Earth, Break On Through With J.F.K., A Night On Java Island, and Soul Mates are also available for download on his site. Except for the latter, all feature Gould in acting roles. 2009 saw the release of his new stand up special, "Let Me Put My Thoughts In You" on Shout! Factory.

Gould provided the voice for the title character in the U.S. versions of the Gex video game series and the U.K. version of the first game. Gould, with his frequent writing partner Rob Cohen, wrote the majority of the jokes for the games. Gould also voiced Hi Larious in Father of the Pride.

He was a regular contributor to the Adam Carolla radio show where he did impressions of Huell Howser. He appears occasionally on The Adam Carolla Show podcast. The first episode of Gould's own podcast The Dana Gould Hour was made available on iTunes on January 31, 2012. Recurring guests include comedians like Eddie Pepitone, and each episode revolves around a singular theme. Currently, a new episode of The Dana Gould Hour is released about every two months.

In 2010, he appeared in live action on the Family Guy episode "Brian Writes a Bestseller."

In 2013, Gould appeared with Melinda Hill and Scott Shriner  in an episode of the web series Romantic Encounters.  He also frequently performs live shows with comedian Arden Myrin as "The Tinkle Twins."

In 2014, Gould participated as a comedian on Playboy's "Foursome: Walk of Shame" where he joined other comedians in making fun of the program's contestants.

In 2016, Gould created the IFC comedy horror series Stan Against Evil, featuring the talent of John C. McGinley, Janet Varney, and Nate Mooney. Gould also appears as the character Kevin, a quirky gravedigger and love interest of Stan's daughter Denise.

Personal life
Gould currently lives in Los Angeles. In 2000 he married Sue Naegle, former President of HBO Entertainment. The couple separated in 2014.  They have three daughters.

Discography
Funhouse (Stand Up! Records) [Record / CD: 1998]
Let Me Put My Thoughts In You (Shout! Factory) [DVD / CD: 2009; Record 2014]
I Know It's Wrong (New Wave Dynamics) [CD: 2013]
Mr. Funny Man (Kill Rock Stars) [MP3: 2017]

Filmography

Television

Film

Video games

Crew work
 Creepshow - Writer ("Night of the Living Late Show")
 Gex - Writer
 Gex: Enter the Gecko - Writer
 Parks and Recreation - Consulting Producer
 Stan Against Evil - Creator, Executive Producer, Writer
 Super Adventure Team - Creator, Writer
 The Simpsons - Writer ("Homer the Moe", "Poppa's Got a Brand New Badge", "C.E. D'oh", "The President Wore Pearls", "Goo Goo Gai Pan", "Bart Has Two Mommies", "I Don't Wanna Know Why the Caged Bird Sings"), Producer (2001), Supervising Producer (2001-2002), Co-Executive Producer (2002-2007)

References

External links

 
 
 
 Review of performance at Comix in New York, October 2008
 

1964 births
20th-century American comedians
20th-century American male actors
20th-century American writers
21st-century American comedians
21st-century American male actors
21st-century American writers
American male comedians
American male television actors
American male television writers
American stand-up comedians
American television writers
Comedians from California
Comedians from Massachusetts
Living people
Male actors from Los Angeles
Male actors from Massachusetts
People from Hopedale, Massachusetts
Screenwriters from California
Screenwriters from Massachusetts
Stand Up! Records artists
University of Massachusetts Amherst alumni
Writers from Los Angeles